The Calcutta Chromosome is a 1995 English-language novel by Indian author Amitav Ghosh. The book, set in Calcutta and New York City at some unspecified time in the future, is a medical thriller that dramatizes the adventures of people who are brought together by a mysterious turn of events. The book is loosely based on the life and times of Sir Ronald Ross, the Nobel Prize–winning scientist who achieved a breakthrough in malaria research in 1898. The novel was the recipient of the Arthur C. Clarke Award in 1997.

Ghosh employs a factual background for the invented events in the novel, drawing upon Ross' Memoirs which were published in 1923.

Plot summary
The novel begins with the story of Antar, a resident of the future New York doing data processing for the International Water Council. A chance bit of data causes Antar to recall a bizarre encounter he had with L. Murugan, an employee of the LifeWatch organization (Antar's former employer), who disappeared in Calcutta in 1995. Murugan had asked to be transferred to Calcutta because of his fascination with the life of Sir Ronald Ross. While Antar tries to track Murugan’s movements in Calcutta through the digitized archives, another narrative thread follows Murugan directly as his path brings him into contact with a variety of other characters, some more savory than others. The plot is quite complex and its timelines are deliberately mixed up, switching from Antar's time to Murugan's to Ross' and back over the course of as many chapters.

Through his research into old and lost documents and phone messages, Antar determines that Murugan had systematically unearthed a deep secret lurking behind Ross' malaria research — an underground scientific and mystical movement that could grant eternal life. Loosely described, the process of securing this form of immortality is as follows: the disciples of this movement can transfer their chromosomes into another's body, and gradually become that person or take over that person. In the novel, Ronald Ross did not discover the mysteries of the malaria parasite; it was a group of underground practitioners of a different, mystical "science," natives of India, who helped to guide Ross to the conclusions for which he is famous. These native Indians provided Ross with clues in the belief that in the moment Ross made his discovery, the parasite would change its nature. At this point, a new variant of malaria would emerge and the group's research using the chromosome-transfer technique would advance even further.

Themes
Silence is a recurring theme in the novel, originating from the often-stated premise that to say something is to change it. Huttunen notes that the workings of the Indian scientific/mystical movement uncovered by Murugan "constitutes a counter-science to Western scientific discourse" (25). The tenets of the group contain aspects of the Hindu belief in the transmigration of souls as well as of contemporary scientific ideas about genetics and cloning (Huttunen 27). Its native Indian members operate through means kept secret from the more Westernized characters and from the reader, and their activities become progressively clearer as the novel continues until their plan is revealed to the reader. Huttunen explains that the methodology of this group is based on the ideas of Emmanuel Levinas about communication by way of silence. In Levinas' view, "the other exists outside the traditional ontology of Western philosophy which conceives of all being as objects that can be internalized by consciousness or grasped by adequate representation ... Consequently silence in this novel represents the kind of unattainable experience that transcends the level of language, or knowing" (30-31). It is this enigma that the novel leaves behind as an abiding theme. The reader is forced to keep thinking about it much after turning the last page. The mystery at the heart of the story is never completely resolved by the author, leaving much to the reader's understanding and interpretation.

Characters
Antar - A man in the future who is about to retire. He is investigating the disappearance of Murugan.
Murugan - He calls himself Morgan from time to time. He lives in the 1990s and is an authority on Sir Ronald Ross. Much of the novel is about his tracking the life of Ronald Ross.
Ronald Ross - The Nobel Prize–winning scientist who found out that malaria is spread through mosquitoes. Much of his research is spoken about. He conducted his experiments on a man called 'Lutchman.' His tale is narrated by Murugan.
Lutchman - He once lived at Renupur station. His family and whole village had been wiped out by a strange epidemic. He was later picked up by Ross for his experiments and did everything for him. He claimed he was a 'dhooley bearer' or a cleaner. Later in the novel it is revealed that his name was actually 'Laakhan' and he changed his name at every village to sound like a local.
Mangala - Cleaning woman at Doctor Cunningham's laboratory, but that's her disguise, she is in reality a Demi God who not only discovered the means of treating syphilis with the Malaria parasite but also found a form of asexual reproduction/reincarnation for humans which kept her and Lutchman alive forever.
Sonali - A writer for Calcutta Magazine, a journalist, and actor who, it is suggested in the novel, transforms herself with the help of Mangala's "science"
Urmila - A journalist for the same publication as Sonali, she is the one Mangala chooses for her transformation or reincarnation.
Romen Haldar - Lutchman in his most recent reincarnation.

Awards
The Calcutta Chromosome won the Arthur C. Clarke Award in 1997.

Sources

Home page at amitavghosh.com

Notes

Further reading 
 
 Bhattacharya, Shayani (2014). "The Silence of the Subaltern: The Rejection of History and Language in Amitav Ghosh's The Calcutta Chromosome." In Bernardo, Susan M. (ed). Environments in Science Fiction: Essays on Alternative Spaces. McFarland. pp.137-153. ISBN 978-0-7864-7579-7
 

 
 

Indian thriller novels
Indian speculative fiction novels
Indian science fiction novels
1995 Indian novels
1995 science fiction novels
Novels set in Kolkata
Novels by Amitav Ghosh